The Kuzgun Dam is an embankment dam on the Serçeme River in Erzurum Province, Turkey. Constructed between 1985 and 1996, the development was backed by the Turkish State Hydraulic Works. The dam has a 23 MW power station and provides water for the irrigation of

See also

List of dams and reservoirs in Turkey

References
DSI, State Hydraulic Works (Turkey), Retrieved December 16, 2009

Dams in Erzurum Province
Hydroelectric power stations in Turkey
Dams completed in 1996